Lipovník is a municipality in the Topoľčany District of the Nitra Region, Slovakia. In 2011 it had 326 inhabitants.

References

External links
http://en.e-obce.sk/obec/lipovnik-topolcany/lipovnik.html
Official homepage

Villages and municipalities in Topoľčany District